Die Urbane. Eine HipHop Partei (The Urbans. A HipHop Party) is a German political party founded in Berlin in February 2017 which locate themselves within the hip hop culture. The main goals of the party include first and foremost social justice; their self-proclaimed goal is to achieve equality among all citizens. In this context, the party supports the introduction of a universal basic income.

During the German federal election on 24 September 2017, they were among the parties listed in the federal state of Berlin.

Election results

German Parliament

References

External links 
 Website

Green political parties in Germany
Universal basic income in Germany
German hip hop
Political parties supporting universal basic income